São Nicolau (English: Saint Nicholas) is a former civil parish (freguesia) in the city and municipality of Lisbon, Portugal. It was 0.25 km² in area with 1,175 inhabitants as of 2001. At the administrative reorganization of Lisbon on 8 December 2012 it became part of the parish Santa Maria Maior.

References 

Former parishes of Lisbon